Jambiani is a group of villages on the Tanzanian island of Unguja, part of Zanzibar. It is located on the southeast coast between Paje and Makunduchi. Jambiani has a strong seaweed culture with many farms dotting the coastline and employing 15,000 locals, mainly women. 
Most seaweed that is farmed here is sold to the Zanea Seaweeds Ltd company and distributed around the globe. The Island of Zanzibar produces around 11,000 tons of seaweed each year, a large amount of this coming from Jambiani sources.

References

Finke, J. (2006) The Rough Guide to Zanzibar (2nd edition). New York: Rough Guides.

Villages in Zanzibar